Tyoka Jackson (born November 22, 1971) is a former professional American football player. He played 12 seasons  in the NFL as a defensive tackle for the Miami Dolphins, Tampa Bay Buccaneers, St. Louis Rams, and Detroit Lions. He retired from football following the 2006 NFL season.

High school years
Jackson attended Bishop McNamara High School in Forestville, Maryland and was a student and a starting defensive lineman on the football team. As a senior football player, he garnered 12 quarterback sacks and more than 100 tackles, and earned All-Metro honors from The Washington Post.

College career
Jackson was a standout on defense at Penn State. As a sophomore, he posted a team-leading 9.5 sacks, and 25 tackles. He earned Defensive Most Valuable Player honors at the 1992 Fiesta Bowl during his sophomore year. His junior season, he won second team All-East honors and garnered three sacks and 25 tackles. As a senior, he was a Football News All-American honorable mention pick, and named first team All-Big Ten. He posted a team-leading eight sacks, in addition to 41 tackles. As a senior, Jackson was a starter in the Senior Bowl All-Star Game. During his college career, he twice led his team in sacks, and graduated from Penn State as the school's second all-time leader in sacks. Jackson was chosen for Penn State's All-Decade team for the 1990s.
In 1994, Jackson earned a Bachelor of Arts in Labor and Industrial Relations from Penn State University with a minor in Business Administration.

NFL
Although he went undrafted, Jackson played in the NFL for 12 years, the fifth-longest among former Penn State players in the NFL. He signed with the Atlanta Falcons as an undrafted free-agent defensive end, and spent most of the 1994 NFL season on the practice squad. He made his on-field NFL debut as a defensive end with the Miami Dolphins, under Hall of Fame coach Don Shula during the playoffs in 1994-95.  Jackson joined the Tampa Bay Buccaneers in late 1996, and played five seasons with the team for Hall of Famer Tony Dungy. Jackson signed with the St. Louis Rams and head coach Mike Martz's “Greatest Show on Turf” in May 2001.  He played in Super Bowl XXXVI for the Rams, a loss to the New England Patriots. Chosen as the team's defensive captain from 2003–05, Jackson was named Captain in Perpetuity in 2005. In 2004, Jackson won the local media's annual “Go To Guy” award, given to the best interview in the Rams’ locker room. In 2005, Jackson was named to the St. Louis Rams’ 10th Anniversary Team in a vote by the fans. He was also selected as one of the St. Louis Rams’ top-10 all-time free agent signings. Jackson finished his career as a member of the Detroit Lions, playing both as a reserve defensive end and tackle and on special teams in 2006-07.

After football
As he was beginning his NFL career, Jackson was also beginning his career as an entrepreneur, founding The Jackson Investment Company, LLC in 1995, and serving as its president. The company specializes in the purchase and development of residential real estate for urban renewal projects. The company also was responsible for bringing the first IHOP franchise to Washington, D.C. It was the first sit-down franchise in the history of the city's 8th Ward. He has since opened a second location in The Columbia Heights neighborhood of D.C. He has served on the board of directors of the Blue Roof Franchisee Association, a member association representing IHOP franchisees, since 2012.

Jackson is a firm believer in giving back to the community. He founded “Tyoka’s Troops” in 1999. For ten years, Tyoka's Troops conducted a variety of service projects including blood drives in Tampa and St. Louis, and partnered with Florida Blood Services and the American Red Cross to raise awareness about the importance of regular blood and bone marrow donation. In 2008–09, Tyoka's Troops also created an incentive program at Malcolm X Elementary School in Jackson's hometown of Washington, D.C. Since 2009, Jackson has been a board member of the YMCA of the Capitol Area (Capitol View Chapter). He also serves on the board of directors for his alma mater, Bishop McNamara High School.

References

External links
Tyoka Jackson's activity with the American Red Cross
"Tyoka's Troops" profiled on St. Louis Rams website

1971 births
Living people
People from Forestville, Maryland
American football defensive ends
American football defensive tackles
Penn State Nittany Lions football players
Players of American football from Maryland
Players of American football from Washington, D.C.
African-American players of American football
Miami Dolphins players
Tampa Bay Buccaneers players
St. Louis Rams players
Detroit Lions players
American real estate businesspeople
Businesspeople from Washington, D.C.
21st-century African-American sportspeople
20th-century African-American sportspeople